Phaedon Georgitsis (21 January 1939 – 1 March 2019) was a Greek actor. He was a popular actor of Greek cinema. He starred in many films, 13 of which were produced by Finos Film. He was also one of the main protagonists of Greek theatre. He died on 1 March 2019, after a battle with brain cancer.

Films 
The Red Lanterns
Gorgones ke Manges (Mermaids and Lads)
Blood on the Land
Marijuana Stop!

References

External links 

1939 births
2019 deaths
20th-century Greek male actors
Greek male film actors
Greek male stage actors
Male actors from Athens
Deaths from brain cancer in Greece